The Great Works River is a  river in southwestern Maine in the United States. It rises in central York County and flows generally south past North Berwick and joins the tidal part of the Salmon Falls River at South Berwick.

The native Newichawannock band of Abenaki called it the Asbenbedick. In July 1634, William Chadbourne, James Wall and John Goddard arrived from England aboard the ship Pied Cow with a commission to build a sawmill and gristmill  at the river's Assabumbadoc Falls.   The sawmill they built, thought to be the first over-shot water-powered site in America, was located in the "Rocky Gorge" below today's Brattle Street bridge.  Their sawmill was rebuilt with up to 20 saws on what was then the "Little River" in 1651 by Richard Leader, an engineer granted exclusive right to the water power. It was thereafter called the "Great mill workes," from which the Great Works River derives its present name.

References

 History of the Great Works Mills -- Old Berwick Historical Society
 History of North Berwick, Maine (1886)
 History of South Berwick, Maine (1886)

External links

 Great Works River Watershed Coalition

Rivers of York County, Maine
South Berwick, Maine
North Berwick, Maine